Los Fresnos  is a city in Cameron County, Texas, United States. The population was 6,542 at the 2010 census, up from 4,512 at the 2000 census. It is part of the Brownsville–Harlingen–Raymondville and the Matamoros–Brownsville metropolitan areas.

Located in south-central Cameron County, the city was named for the fresnos (Fraxinus berlandieriana) scattered in the woods and along streams. In 1912, Lon Hill, an early landowner, formed a company to develop a canal system that would use the Rio Grande to irrigate land for farming. Railroad construction in the early 1900s began to bring settlers to the area, and by 1915, a post office was established. Because of the fertile, irrigated land, farm products increased, and with the long growing season in the Rio Grande Valley, farming flourished. Today, the city is still surrounded by fertile farm/ranch land. Major crops are cotton, sugarcane, grains, oranges, and red grapefruit.

Geography

Los Fresnos is located slightly south of the geographic center of Cameron County at  (26.073216, –97.478164).

Situated slightly north of the city of Brownsville, Los Fresnos shares its average temperatures, which land it in a humid subtropical climate, but like the rest of the lower Rio Grande Valley, fluctuating temperatures cause the area to transition between a humid subtropical climate and a tropical savanna climate. Due to this, tropical vegetation grows widely around the surrounding area. Temperature extremes range from highs near 100 °F in the summer down to around freezing temperatures about once or twice a year, and not at all during some years. In addition, Los Fresnos is prone to impact by hurricanes. Notable hurricanes to hit the area include Beulah, Allen, and Dolly. Thunderstorm activity occurs usually during the spring and fall when cold fronts cause instability with the region's warm climate. While not a common occurrence, the city occasionally experiences hail or brief tornados.

Demographics

2020 census

As of the 2020 United States census, there were 8,114 people, 2,196 households, and 1,798 families residing in the city.

2000 census
As of the census of 2000,  4,512 people, 1,296 households, and 1,092 families resided in the city. The population density was 1,868.9 people per square mile (722.9/km). The 1,480 housing units averaged 613.0 per square mile (237.1/km). The racial makeup of the city was 81.96% White, 0.42% African American, 0.13% Native American, 0.02% Asian, 0.09% Pacific Islander, 14.38% from other races, and 2.99% from two or more races. Hispanics or Latinos of any race were 84.62% of the population.

Of the 1,296 households, 53.5% had children under the age of 18 living with them, 63.7% were married couples living together, 17.7% had a female householder with no husband present, and 15.7% were not families. About 14.2% of all households were made up of individuals, and 7.7% had someone living alone who was 65 years of age or older. The average household size was 3.48, and the average family size was 3.86.

In the city, the population was distributed as 36.4% under the age of 18, 9.2% from 18 to 24, 29.2% from 25 to 44, 17.1% from 45 to 64, and 8.1% who were 65 years of age or older. The median age was 28 years. For every 100 females, there were 93.8 males. For every 100 females age 18 and over, there were 84.6 males.

The median income for a household in the city was $25,793, and for a family was $27,670. Males had a median income of $20,459 versus $17,904 for females. The per capita income for the city was $9,507. About 28.5% of families and 34.2% of the population were below the poverty line, including 43.8% of those under age 18 and 22.4% of those age 65 or over.

Government and infrastructure
The United States Postal Service operates the Los Fresnos Post Office.

Local public transportation is provided by Valley Metro.

Sites of interest
The Los Fresnos PRCA Rodeo and Livestock Show is held every year the first week in February.

Los Fresnos Motocross Park has campsites available at the track to accommodate recreational vehicles and tents. Quads are also welcomed to race, with categories for every age and bike sizes, such as Mini 50-cc, 250-cc, quads, etc.

Little Graceland is on West Highway 100 and contains a small collection of Elvis Presley memorabilia, including photos, posters, watches, and playing cards. It is operated by Simon Vega, who served with Presley in the Army in Germany from 1958 to 1960.

Education
Los Fresnos is served by the Los Fresnos Consolidated Independent School District.

The Ethel L. Whipple Memorial Library serves Los Fresnos.

Media

Newspapers
 Los Fresnos News

Radio stations

 KFRQ 94.5FM – Official Site
 KKPS 99.5FM – Official Site
 KNVO 101.1FM – Official Site
 KBFM 104.1FM – Official Site
 KLME 105.5FM 
 KVLY 107.9FM – Official Site

References

External links

 City of Los Fresnos official website
 Los Fresnos, Tx in Handbook of Texas Online
 Los Fresnos Rodeo
 Los Fresnos News

Cities in Texas
Cities in Cameron County, Texas